HLA-B62 (B62) is an HLA-B serotype. The serotype identifies certain B*15 gene-allele protein products of HLA-B.

B62 is the largest of many split antigens of the broad antigen, B15. B62 best identifies the B*1501, B*1504, B*1507 B*1525 and B*1533 allele products.

Serotype

Alleles

References

6